Lauren Alexandra Taylor (born June 16, 1998) is an American actress and singer. She is known for playing one of the lead characters, Shelby, on the 2015–2016 Disney Channel comedy series Best Friends Whenever. Taylor previously starred as Harper, Richie's older sister in the 2015 Netflix series Richie Rich.

Life and career 
Taylor was born in Littleton, Colorado and grew up in San Diego, California.

At the age of fourteen she opened for Wilson Phillips; she has also opened for Michael Bolton, Vanessa Williams, and Debbie Gibson. She is a regular at the House of Blues San Diego and House of Blues Sunset, and was one of the opening acts at the San Diego County Fair in Del Mar in 2015.

Taylor has two brothers who are twins. In 2016, she was living with her mother and brothers in Southern California.

Filmography

References

External links 
 
 

1998 births
Living people
People from Littleton, Colorado
American child actresses
American television actresses
American child singers
21st-century American actresses
21st-century American singers
Actresses from San Diego
Musicians from San Diego
Singers from California
21st-century American women singers

Singers from Colorado